Todd Woodbridge and Mark Woodforde were the defending champions but only Woodbridge competed that year with Wayne Arthurs.

Arthurs and Woodbridge lost in the final 6–7(5–7), 6–4, 6–4 against David Macpherson and Grant Stafford.

Seeds
  Wayne Arthurs /  Todd Woodbridge (final)
  Joshua Eagle /  Andrew Florent (semifinals)
  Michael Hill /  Jeff Tarango (quarterfinals)
  Justin Gimelstob /  Scott Humphries (first round)

Draw

Qualifying

Seeds
  Cristian Brandi /  Aleksandar Kitinov (first round)
  Michael Kohlmann /  Michaël Llodra (Qualifiers)

Qualifiers
  Michael Kohlmann /  Michaël Llodra

Draw

References
 2001 AAPT Championships Doubles Draw
 2001 AAPT Championships Doubles Qualifying Draw

Next Generation Adelaide International
2001 ATP Tour
2001 in Australian tennis